Cady Staley (December 12, 1840 – June 27, 1928) was the first president of Case School of Applied Science, now Case Western Reserve University.

Biography

Staley was born in Florida, Montgomery County, New York on December 12, 1840. He earned three degrees from Union College of Schenectady, New York, to include his B.A. (1865), C.E. (1866), and Ph.D. (1886).
He worked at Union College as an instructor in Civil Engineering from 1867-1868, a professor of that subject from 1868-1876, and the Dean of the Faculty from 1876-1886.

He married Kate Holcomb on December 23, 1869.  Staley also served as an engineer on the building of the Central Pacific Railroad.

In 1886, Staley became the first president of Case School of Applied Science in Cleveland, Ohio, holding the office until 1902.  During and after his tenure, he also served as a professor of Civil Engineering, Political Economy, and Economics.

Staley died at his home in Amsterdam, New York on June 27, 1928.

Writings

He was the author of:

 The Separate System of Sewerage (1886) with George Spencer Pierson

References

External links
 Case Western Reserve University bio 
 

Case Western Reserve University faculty
People from Florida, Montgomery County, New York
Union College (New York) alumni
Union College (New York) faculty
1840 births
1929 deaths
Presidents of Case Western Reserve University